"California Sun" is a rock song first recorded by American rhythm and blues singer Joe Jones.  Henry Glover is credited on the original 45 rpm single as the songwriter, although Roulette Records owner Morris Levy's name sometimes incorrectly appears on re-issues.  In 1961, Roulette issued the song with "Please Don't Talk About Me When I'm Gone" as the B-side. The single reached number 89 on Billboard's Hot 100.

The Rivieras cover

The most successful version of the song was released by the Rivieras in 1963 and became the group's biggest hit in their short career. This song was the result of their first recording session at Chicago's Columbia Recording Studios in 1963 (purchased by manager Bill Dobslaw). The lineup for this session included Marty Fortson on vocals and rhythm guitar, Joe Pennell on lead guitar, Doug Gean on bass guitar, Otto Nuss on Vox Continental organ, and Paul Dennert on drums. The original single cut from this session included the song "Played On" as the A-side, with "California Sun" as the B-side and was released on Dobslaw's Riviera label in 1963. DJ Art Roberts ensured that the "California Sun" side saw significant airplay on WLS. In response to the growing success, Dobslaw got the band a national distribution deal with USA Records, and the song was adequately distributed with "H.B. Goose Step" as the B-side.

The song entered the charts on January 25, 1964, peaking at number five on the US Billboard Hot 100 chart. It remained on the charts for 10 weeks. The song was further hailed as the last American rock and roll hit before the British Invasion. Shortly after the song's release, the band experienced internal problems as Fortson and Pennell enlisted in the Marines, in addition to various lineup changes afterwards. A re-recording of the song with new lyrics, titled "Arizona Sun" was recorded in 1964, but not released until 2000 on the compilation Let's Stomp with The Rivieras! Unissued 1964 Recordings.  "California Sun" was eventually featured on the band's debut album Let's Have a Party. A later version was released later that year as "California Sun '65" on their second and final album, Campus Party.

The song was used in the 1987 movie Good Morning, Vietnam, as well as on its soundtrack album.  It was also featured in the 1991 biopic The Doors.  It was also one of many California-related songs played throughout "Sunshine Plaza" in the original Disney California Adventure. and can also be heard as part of the background music loop at Disney's Typhoon Lagoon water park. Their version was also used as a promotional song for the 2010 Major League Baseball All-Star Game which took place at Angel Stadium, the home of the Los Angeles Angels.

Chart history

Other versions

Annette Funicello covered it in 1963.
 A group called the Invaders recorded a cover in 1968, which sounds similar to the Rivieras version.
 The Crickets recorded their version for their LP of the same name in 1964 (Liberty LRP 3351 / LST 7351).
The New York City rock band the Dictators included their own cover of the song on their 1975 Go Girl Crazy! debut album.
The song was performed by the Ramones on their 1977 Leave Home album and used in their 1979 Rock 'n' Roll High School motion picture. This version is on various compilations, including All the Stuff (And More!) Volume 1 and Hey Ho! Let's Go: The Anthology.
The Ramones cover was also used in Jackass: The Movie (and on the soundtrack album) and in The X-Files season 11 episode This; while the Rivieras' version was used in Oliver Stone's The Doors, when Jim Morrison (played by Val Kilmer) arrives in Venice Beach. 
Bobby Fuller recorded a cover version that can be found on El Paso Rock: Early Recordings Volume 3.
Tommy James & the Shondells recorded a cover of the song for their 1967 album, I Think We're Alone Now.
William Penn and the Quakers recorded a single released on the Melron Records label in 1967. 
The song has often been played live by Chris Isaak and his band Silvertone, with drummer Kenney Dale Johnson assuming lead vocals and Isaak on drums.
The song was covered by Frankie Avalon in the 1987 movie, Back to the Beach.
Santa Cruz Beach Boardwalk uses various versions in their radio and television advertisements since 1997, notably for their 100th anniversary in 2007.
Dave Alvin performed the song backed by Los Straitjackets on the 2001 album Sing Along With Los Straitjackets.
It was used in the 2007 film, Alvin and the Chipmunks during the fight over the remote control.
The Offspring covered the song (in the style of the Ramones) on their Days Go By Tour in 2013.
English band Palma Violets covered it as the B-side of their single "We Found Love".
A version by Swedish band Ola & the Janglers was released in 1970 (sung in English).
Dick Dale recorded his version of the song on the album Unknown Territory for HighTone Records in 1994.
A version of this song was covered by Brian Wilson for the movie Curious George 2: Follow That Monkey!.
Mike Love released his version on his 2019 album 12 Sides of Summer.

References

External links
 Bob Greene "Take a guess where "California Sun" is from", Jewish World Review, June 7, 1999

1964 singles
1981 singles
The Rivieras songs
Dick Dale songs
Gyllene Tider songs
Ramones songs
Tommy James and the Shondells songs
Songs about California
Football songs and chants
Songs written by Henry Glover
1961 songs
Song recordings produced by Tony Bongiovi
Song recordings produced by Tommy Ramone
The Crickets songs